Sarupsar Junction railway station is a railway station in Shri Ganganagar district, Rajasthan. Its code is SRPR. It serves Sarupsar village. The station consists of 2 platforms. Passenger trains halt here.

References

Railway stations in Sri Ganganagar district
Bikaner railway division